Kalateh-ye Sadat-e Pain (also Romanized as Kalāteh-ye Sādāt-e Pā’īn; also known as Kalāteh-ye Sādāt and Kalāteh-ye Sādāt-e Soflá) is a village in Forumad Rural District, in the Central District of Meyami County, Semnan Province, Iran. At the 2006 census, its population was 202, in 53 families.

References 

Populated places in Meyami County